The Tasmania Southern League One (also known as Division One) is a soccer league in Southern Tasmania.  It sits below the NPL Tasmania and Southern Championship in the Tasmanian league system, and nationally all these leagues also sit under the A-League. It is run by the Football Federation Tasmania (FFT).  The league includes teams from Hobart and Southern Tasmania.  The league composition has varied in some seasons containing only senior teams from clubs and at other times also including some reserve teams from clubs higher in the Tasmanian league system.

Clubs

2012 Southern League One Clubs

Previous Clubs

Champions

The champions are the top of the table after the regular season, unlike many other football leagues in Australia there is no finals system in League One.

External links
 Football Federation Tasmania - official website

References

Soccer leagues in Tasmania
Fourth level football leagues in Asia